The Stevenson–Wydler Technology Innovation Act of 1980 (Pub.L. 96–480) (94 Stat. 2311) was the first major U.S. technology transfer law. It required federal laboratories to actively participate in and budget for technology transfer activities.

The Stevenson–Wydler Technology Innovation Act was signed into law by U.S. President Jimmy Carter on October 21, 1980.

The Stevenson–Wydler Act specifies, that inventors at government laboratories receive the first $2,000 of royalties each year plus 15% of any additional royalties. Such details are in contrast with the Bayh–Dole Act, which leaves up to the universities the decision how to split the revenue between the inventors and the institution.

Background
The Act made it easier for federal laboratories to transfer technology to nonfederal entities and provided outside organizations with a means for accessing federal laboratory technologies.

The primary focus of the Stevenson–Wydler Act was to disseminate information from the federal government to the public and to require federal laboratories to actively engage in the technology transfer process. The law requires laboratories to set apart a percentage of the laboratory budget specifically for technology transfer activities. The law, specified in 15 USC § 3710, also established an Office of Research and Technology Applications (ORTA)-- staffed by at least 1 full-time person—in any laboratory with 200 or more scientific, engineering, or related technical positions, in order to coordinate and promote technology transfer.

The Act created the Technology Administration in the Commerce Department. which lasted until 2007.

This Act was the first of a number of laws defining and promoting technology transfer. The law was later amended by the Federal Technology Transfer Act of 1986 and the America COMPETES Acts.

See also
 Bayh–Dole Act of 1980 (P.L. 96-517)
 Executive Order 12999: Educational Technology
 Federal Technology Transfer Act of 1986

References

External links
 Stevenson-Wydler Technology Innovation Act of 1980 (PDF/details) as amended in the GPO Statute Compilations collection

United States federal commerce legislation
Technology transfer